A.O.T. Alimos F.C. is a Greek football club, based in, Alimos, Athens.

The club was founded in 1957 as A.O Trachones F.C. The name of the team was changed to the current name in the summer of 2014 after the team was promoted to play in the Football League for the season 2014–15.

Honours

Domestic
Football League 2 
Winners (1): 2013–14

External links 
 Official Website 

Football clubs in Attica